General elections were held in Mexico in September 1857. They were the first to be held under the February 1857 constitution, which introduced direct elections for the presidency, abolished the Senate, and introduced universal male suffrage for citizens aged 18 (if married) or 20 (if single), as long as they had an "honest mode of living".

Incumbent president Ignacio Comonfort was re-elected with over 92% of the vote, defeating Miguel Lerdo de Tejada.

Results

President

References

Mexico
General
Presidential elections in Mexico
Election and referendum articles with incomplete results